Montserrat is a British Overseas Territory in the Caribbean. It is part of the Leeward Islands, the northern portion of the Lesser Antilles chain of the West Indies. It is nicknamed "The Emerald Isle of the Caribbean" both for its resemblance to coastal Ireland and for the Irish ancestry of many of its inhabitants. Montserrat is the only non-fully sovereign full member of the Caribbean Community and the Organisation of Eastern Caribbean States.

On 18 July 1995, the previously dormant Soufrière Hills volcano, in the southern part of the island, became active. Eruptions destroyed Montserrat's Georgian era capital city of Plymouth. Between 1995 and 2000, two-thirds of the island's population was forced to flee, primarily to the United Kingdom, leaving fewer than 1,200 people on the island in 1997 (rising to nearly 5,000 by 2016). The volcanic activity continues, mostly affecting the vicinity of Plymouth, including its docking facilities, and the eastern side of the island around the former W. H. Bramble Airport, the remnants of which were buried by flows from volcanic activity on 11 February 2010.

An exclusion zone, encompassing the southern part of the island to as far north as parts of the Belham Valley, was imposed because of the size of the existing volcanic dome and the resulting potential for pyroclastic activity. Visitors are generally not permitted entry into the exclusion zone, but a view of the destruction of Plymouth can be seen from the top of Garibaldi Hill in Isles Bay. Relatively quiet since early 2010, the volcano continues to be closely monitored by the Montserrat Volcano Observatory.

In 2015, it was announced that planning would begin on a new town and port at Little Bay on the northwest coast of the island. While additional plans proceeded, the centre of government and businesses was moved to Brades. After a number of delays, including Hurricanes Irma and Maria in 2017 and the COVID-19 pandemic beginning in early 2020, in June 2022, ground was broken on the Little Bay Port Development Project, a £28 million project funded by the UK and the Caribbean Development Bank.

Etymology 
In 1493, Christopher Columbus named the island Santa María de Montserrate, after the Virgin of Montserrat in the Monastery of Montserrat, on Montserrat mountain, near Barcelona in Catalonia, Spain. "Montserrat" means "serrated mountain" in Catalan.

History

Pre-colonial era
Archaeological field work in 2012 in Montserrat's Centre Hills indicated there was an Archaic (pre-Arawak) occupation between 2000–500 BCE. Later coastal sites show the presence of the Saladoid culture (until 550 CE). The native Caribs are believed to have called the island Alliouagana, meaning 'Land of the Prickly Bush'.

In 2016, nine petroglyphs were discovered by local residents hiking in a wooded area near Soldier Ghaut. Another was discovered in 2018 in the same area of the island. The carvings are believed to be 1000-1500 years old.

Early European period
In November 1493, Christopher Columbus passed Montserrat in his second voyage, after being told that the island was unoccupied due to raids by the Caribs.

A number of Irishmen settled in Monsterrat in 1632. Most came from nearby Saint Kitts at the instigation of the island's governor Thomas Warner, with more settlers arriving later from Virginia. The first settlers "appear to have been cultivators, each working his own little farm".

The preponderance of Irish in the first wave of European settlers led a leading legal scholar to remark that a "nice question" is whether the original settlers took with them the law of the Kingdom of Ireland insofar as it differed from the law of the Kingdom of England.

The Irish being historical allies of the French, especially in their dislike of the English, invited the French to claim the island in 1666, although no troops were sent by France to maintain control. However, the French did attack and briefly occupy the island in the late 1660s; it was captured shortly afterwards by the English and English control of the island was confirmed under the Treaty of Breda the following year. Despite the seizing by force of the island by the English, the island's legal status is that of a "colony acquired by settlement".

A neo-feudal colony developed amongst the so-called "redlegs". The colonists began to transport Sub-Saharan African slaves for labour, as was common to most Caribbean islands. The colonists built an economy based on the production of sugar, rum, arrowroot and sea island cotton, cultivated on large plantations by slave labour. By the late 18th century, numerous plantations had been developed on the island.

18th century 
There was a brief French attack on Montserrat in 1712. On 17 March 1768, a slave rebellion failed but their efforts were remembered. Slavery was abolished in 1834. In 1985, the people of Montserrat made St Patrick's Day a ten-day public holiday to commemorate the uprising. Festivities celebrate the culture and history of Montserrat in song, dance, food and traditional costumes.

In 1782, during the American Revolutionary War, as America's first ally, France captured Montserrat in their war of support of the Americans. The French, not intent on truly colonising the island, then agreed to return the island to Great Britain under the 1783 Treaty of Paris.

New crops and politics 
Britain abolished slavery in Montserrat and its other territories effective August 1834.

During the nineteenth century, falling sugar prices had an adverse effect on the island's economy, as Brazil and other nations competed in the trade.

The first lime tree orchards on the island were planted in 1852 by a local planter Mr Burke. Later, in 1857, the British philanthropist Joseph Sturge bought a sugar estate to prove it was economically viable to employ paid labour rather than slaves. Numerous members of the Sturge family bought additional land. In 1869, the family established the Montserrat Company Limited and planted Key lime trees, started the commercial production of lime juice, with more than 100,000 gallons produced annually by 1895, set up a school, and sold parcels of land to the inhabitants of the island. The pure lime juice was transported in casks to England where it was clarified and bottled by Evans, Sons & Co, of Liverpool, with a trade mark on each bottle intended to guarantee quality to the public. 

Much of Montserrat came to be owned by smallholders.

From 1871 to 1958, Montserrat was administered as part of the federal crown colony of the British Leeward Islands, becoming a province of the short-lived West Indies Federation from 1958 to 1962. The first Chief Minister of Montserrat was William Henry Bramble of the Montserrat Labour Party from 1960 to 1970; he worked to promote labour rights and boost tourism to the island, and Montserrat's original airport was named in his honour. However, Bramble's son Percival Austin Bramble was critical of the way tourist facilities were being constructed, and he subsequently set up his own party (the Progressive Democratic Party) which went on to win the 1970 Montserratian general election, with Percival Bramble serving as Chief Minister from 1970 to 1978. The period 1978 to 1991 was dominated politically by Chief Minister John Osborne and his People's Liberation Movement; his brief flirtation with possibly declaring independence never materialised.

On 10 May 1991, the Caribbean Territories order came into force, formally abolishing the death penalty for murder on Montserrat.

Corruption allegations within the PLM party resulted in the collapse of the Osborne government in 1991, with Reuben Meade becoming the new chief minister. As a result, early elections were called.

In 1995, Montserrat was devastated by the catastrophic volcanic eruptions of the Soufrière Hills, which destroyed the capital city of Plymouth, and necessitated the evacuation of a large part of the island. Many Montserratians emigrated abroad, mainly to the United Kingdom, though in recent years some have started returning. The eruptions rendered the entire southern half of the island uninhabitable, and it is currently designated an Exclusion Zone with restricted access.

Criticism of the Montserratian government's response to the disaster led to the resignation of Chief Minister Bertrand Osborne in 1997, after only a year in office, and being replaced by David Brandt who remained in office until 2001. Since leaving office, Brandt has been the subject of multiple criminal investigation into alleged sex offences with minors. He was found guilty of six counts of sexual exploitation and sentenced to fifteen years in July 2021.

John Osborne returned as Chief Minister following victory in the 2001 election, being ousted by Lowell Lewis of the Montserrat Democratic Party in 2006. Reuben Meade returned to office in 2009 to 2014; during his term the post of Chief Minister was replaced with that of Premier.

In the autumn of 2017, Montserrat was not hit by Hurricane Irma and sustained only minor damage from Hurricane Maria.

Since November 2019, Easton Taylor-Farrell of the Movement for Change and Prosperity party has been the island's Premier.

Politics and government

Montserrat is an internally self-governing overseas territory of the United Kingdom. The United Nations Committee on Decolonization includes Montserrat on the United Nations list of non-self-governing territories. The island's head of state is King Charles III, represented by an appointed Governor. Executive power is exercised by the government, whereas the Premier is the head of government. The Premier is appointed by the Governor from among the members of the Legislative Assembly which consists of nine elected members. The leader of the party with a majority of seats is usually the one who is appointed. Legislative power is vested in both the government and the Legislative Assembly. The Assembly also includes two ex officio members, the attorney general and financial secretary.

The Judiciary is independent of the executive and the legislature.

Administrative Divisions 
For the purposes of local government, Montserrat is divided into three parishes. Going north to south, they are:
 Saint Peter Parish
 Saint Georges Parish
 Saint Anthony Parish

The locations of settlements on the island have been vastly changed since the volcanic activity began. Only Saint Peter Parish in the northwest of the island is now inhabited, with a population of between 4000 and 6000, the other two parishes being still too dangerous to inhabit.

A significantly more up-to-date administrative division type would be the 3 Census regions, primarily used for the population census. Going north to south, they are:

 Northern Region (2,369 Pop)
 Central Region (1,666 Pop)
 South of Nantes river (887 Pop)

For census purposes, these are further divided into 23 Enumeration districts.

Police
Policing is primarily the responsibility of the Royal Montserrat Police Service.

Military and Defence

The defence of Montserrat is the responsibility of the United Kingdom. The Royal Navy maintains a ship on permanent station in the Caribbean and additionally sends another Royal Navy or Royal Fleet Auxiliary ship as a part of the Atlantic Patrol (NORTH) tasking. These ships' main mission in the region is to maintain British sovereignty for the overseas territories, provide humanitarian aid and disaster relief during disasters such as hurricanes, which are common in the area, and conduct counter-narcotics operations.

Royal Montserrat Defence Force

The Royal Montserrat Defence Force is the home defence unit of the British Overseas Territory of Montserrat. Raised in 1899, the unit is today a reduced force of about forty volunteer soldiers, primarily concerned with civil defence and ceremonial duties. The unit has a historical association with the Irish Guards.

Communications 
The island is served by landline telephones, fully digitalised, with 3000 subscribers and by mobile cellular, with an estimated number of 5000 handsets in use. An estimated 2860 users have internet access. These are July 2016 estimates. Public radio service is provided by Radio Montserrat. There is a single television broadcaster, PTV. Cable and satellite television service is available.

The UK Postcode for directing mail to Montserrat is MSR followed by four digits according to the destination town, for example, the postcode for Little Bay is MSR1120.

Geography 

It comprises  and is gradually increasing owing to the buildup of volcanic deposits on the south-east coast. The major mountains are (from north to south) Silver Hill, Katy Hill in the Centre Hills range, the Soufrière Hills and the South Soufrière Hills.

The 2011 estimate by the CIA indicates that 30% of the island's land is classified as agricultural, 20% as arable, 25% as forest and the balance as "other".

Montserrat has a few tiny off-shore islands, such as Little Redonda off its north coast and Pinnacle Rock and Statue Rock off its east.

Volcano and exclusion zone 

The southern part of the island was evacuated and visits are severely restricted. The exclusion zone also includes two sea areas adjacent to the land areas of most volcanic activity.

After the destruction of Plymouth and disruption of the economy, more than half of the population left the island, which also lacked housing. During the late 1990s, additional eruptions occurred. On 25 June 1997, a pyroclastic flow travelled down Mosquito Ghaut. This pyroclastic surge could not be restrained by the ghaut and spilled out of it, killing 19 people who were in the (officially evacuated) Streatham village area. Several others in the area suffered severe burns.

In recognition of the disaster, in 1998, the people of Montserrat were granted full residency rights in the United Kingdom, allowing them to migrate if they chose. British citizenship was granted in 2002.

For a number of years in the early 2000s, the volcano's activity consisted mostly of infrequent ventings of ash into the uninhabited areas in the south. The ash falls occasionally extended into the northern and western parts of the island. In the most recent period of increased activity at the Soufrière Hills volcano, from November 2009 through February 2010, ash vented and there was a vulcanian explosion that sent pyroclastic flows down several sides of the mountain. Travel into parts of the exclusion zone was occasionally allowed, though only by a licence from the Royal Montserrat Police Force. Since 2014 the area has been split into multiple subzones with varying entry and use restrictions, based on volcanic activity: some areas even being (in 2020) open 24 hours and inhabited. The most dangerous zone, which includes the former capital, remains forbidden to casual visitors due to volcanic and other hazards, especially due to the lack of maintenance in destroyed areas. It is legal to visit this area when accompanied by a government-authorized guide.

The northern part of Montserrat has largely been unaffected by volcanic activity, and remains lush and green. In February 2005, Princess Anne officially opened what is now called the John A. Osborne Airport in the north. Since 2011, it handles several flights daily operated by Fly Montserrat Airways. Docking facilities are in place at Little Bay, where the new capital town is being constructed; the new government centre is at Brades, a short distance away.

Wildlife 

Montserrat, like many isolated islands, is home to rare, endemic plant and animal species. Work undertaken by the Montserrat National Trust in collaboration with the Royal Botanic Gardens, Kew has centred on the conservation of pribby (Rondeletia buxifolia) in the Centre Hills region. Until 2006, this species was known only from one book about the vegetation of Montserrat. In 2006, conservationists also rescued several plants of the endangered Montserrat orchid (Epidendrum montserratense) from dead trees on the island and installed them in the security of the island's botanic garden.

Montserrat is also home to the critically endangered giant ditch frog (Leptodactylus fallax), known locally as the mountain chicken, found only in Montserrat and Dominica. The species has undergone catastrophic declines due to the amphibian disease Chytridiomycosis and the volcanic eruption in 1997. Experts from Durrell Wildlife Conservation Trust have been working with the Montserrat Department of Environment to conserve the frog in-situ in a project called "Saving the Mountain Chicken", and an ex-situ captive breeding population has been set up in partnership with Durrell Wildlife Conservation Trust, Zoological Society of London, Chester Zoo, Parken Zoo, and the Governments of Montserrat and Dominica. Releases from this programme have already taken place in a hope to increase the numbers of the frog and reduce extinction risk from Chytridiomycosis.

The national bird is the endemic Montserrat oriole (Icterus oberi). The IUCN Red List classifies it as vulnerable, having previously listed it as critically endangered. Captive populations are held in several zoos in the UK including: Chester Zoo, London Zoo, Jersey Zoo and Edinburgh Zoo.

The Montserrat galliwasp (Diploglossus montisserrati), a type of lizard, is endemic to Montserrat and is listed on the IUCN Red List as critically endangered. A species action plan has been developed for this species.

In 2005, a biodiversity assessment for the Centre Hills was conducted. To support the work of local conservationists, a team of international partners, including Durrell Wildlife Conservation Trust, Royal Botanic Gardens, Kew, Royal Society for the Protection of Birds and Montana State University, carried out extensive surveys and collected biological data. Researchers from Montana State University found that the invertebrate fauna was particularly rich on the island. The report found that the number of invertebrate species known to occur in Montserrat is 1241. The number of known beetle species is 718 species from 63 families. It is estimated that 120 invertebrates are endemic to Montserrat.

Montserrat is known for its coral reefs and its caves along the shore. These caves house many species of bats, and efforts are underway to monitor and protect the ten species of bats from extinction.

The Montserrat tarantula (Cyrtopholis femoralis) is the only species of tarantula native to the island. It was first bred in captivity at the Chester Zoo in August 2016.

Climate 
Montserrat has a tropical rainforest climate (Af according to the Köppen climate classification) with the temperature being warm and consistent year-round, and lots of precipitation. Summer and autumn are wetter because of Atlantic hurricanes.

Economy 

Montserrat's economy was devastated by the 1995 eruption and its aftermath; currently the island's operating budget is largely supplied by the British government and administered through the Department for International Development (DFID) amounting to approximately £25 million per year. Additional amounts are secured through income and property taxes, licence and other fees as well as customs duties levied on imported goods.

The limited economy of Montserrat, with a population under 5000, consumes 2.5 MW of electric power, produced by five diesel generators. Two exploratory geothermal wells have found good resources and the pad for a third geothermal well was prepared in 2016. Together the geothermal wells are expected to produce more power than the island requires. A 250 kW solar PV station was commissioned in 2019, with plans for another 750 kW.

A report published by the CIA indicates that the value of exports totalled the equivalent of US$5.7 million (2017 est.), consisting primarily of electronic components, plastic bags, apparel, hot peppers, limes, live plants and cattle. The value of imports totalled US$31.02 million (2016 est.), consisting primarily of machinery and transportation equipment, foodstuffs, manufactured goods, fuels and lubricants.

In 1979, The Beatles producer George Martin opened AIR Studios Montserrat, making the island popular with musicians who often went there to record while taking advantage of the island's climate and beautiful surroundings. In the early hours of 17 September 1989, Hurricane Hugo passed the island as a Category 4 hurricane, damaging more than 90% of the structures on the island. AIR Studios Montserrat closed, and the tourist economy was virtually wiped out. The slowly recovering tourist industry was again wiped out with the eruption of the Soufrière Hills Volcano in 1995, although it began partially to recover within fifteen years.

Transport

Air
John A. Osborne Airport is the only airport on the island (constructed after the W. H. Bramble Airport was destroyed in 1997 by the volcanic eruption). Scheduled service to Antigua is provided by FlyMontserrat and ABM Air. Charter flights are also available to the surrounding islands.

Sea
Ferry service to the island was provided by the Jaden Sun Ferry. It ran from Heritage Quay in St. John's, Antigua and Barbuda to Little Bay on Montserrat. The ride was about an hour and a half and operated five days a week.

This service stopped in 2019 due to being financially unsustainable and the only access to Montserrat now is by air.

Demographics 

Montserrat had a population of 7,119 in 1842.

The island had a population of 5,879 (according to a 2008 estimate). An estimated 8,000 refugees left the island (primarily to the UK) following the resumption of volcanic activity in July 1995; the population was 13,000 in 1994. The 2011 Montserrat census indicated a population of 4,922. In early 2016, the estimated population had reached nearly 5,000 primarily due to immigration from other islands.

Age structure (2003 estimates):

 up to 14 years: 23.4% (male 1,062; female 1,041)
 15 to 64 years: 65.3% (male 2,805; female 3,066)
 65 years and over: 11.3% (male 537; female 484)

The median age of the population was 28.1 as of 2002 and the sex ratio was 0.96 males/female as of 2000.

The population growth rate is 6.9% (2008 est.), with a birth rate of 17.57 births/1,000 population, death rate of 7.34 deaths/1,000 population (2003 est.), and net migration rate of 195.35/1,000 population (2000 est.) There is an infant mortality rate of 7.77 deaths/1000 live births (2003 est.). The life expectancy at birth is 78.36 years: 76.24 for males and 80.59 for females (2003 est.). The total fertility rate is 1.8 children born/woman (2003 est.).

According to a United Nations estimate, the population as of April 2018 was 5,197 (for a density of 52 per square kilometre or 135 people per square mile), with just over 90% living in non-urban areas.

Language
English is the sole official language and the main spoken language. A few thousand people speak Montserrat Creole, a dialect of Leeward Caribbean Creole English. Historically Irish was spoken, but not any more.

Irish language in Montserrat 
The Irish constituted the largest proportion of the white population from the founding of the colony in 1628. Most were indentured servants; others were merchants or plantation owners. The geographer Thomas Jeffrey claimed in The West India Atlas (1780) that the majority of those on Montserrat were either Irish or of Irish descent, "so that the use of the Irish language is preserved on the island, even among the Negroes."

African slaves and Irish indentured servants of all classes were in constant contact, with sexual relationships being common and a population of mixed descent appearing as a consequence. The Irish were also prominent in Caribbean commerce, with their merchants importing Irish goods such as beef, pork, butter and herring, and also importing slaves.

There is indirect evidence that the use of the Irish language continued in Montserrat until at least the middle of the nineteenth century. The Kilkenny diarist and Irish scholar Amhlaoibh Ó Súilleabháin noted in 1831 that he had heard that Irish was still spoken in Montserrat by both black and white inhabitants.

In 1852, Henry H. Breen wrote in Notes and Queries: a Medium of Intercommunication for Literary Men, etc., "The statement that 'the Irish language is spoken in the West India Islands, and that in some of them it may be said to be almost vernacular,' is true of the little Island of Montserrat, but has no foundation with respect to the other colonies."

In 1902, The Irish Times quoted the Montreal Family Herald in a description of Montserrat, noting that "the negroes to this day speak the old Irish Gaelic tongue, or English with an Irish brogue. A story is told of a Connaught man who, on arriving at the island, was, to his astonishment, hailed in a vernacular Irish by the black people."

A letter by W. F. Butler in The Atheneum (15 July 1905) quotes an account by a Cork civil servant, C. Cremen, of what he had heard from a retired sailor called John O'Donovan, a fluent Irish speaker:

The British phonetician John C. Wells conducted research into speech in Montserrat in 1977–78 (which included also Montserratians resident in London). He found media claims that Irish speech, whether Anglo-Irish or Irish Gaelic, influenced contemporary Montserratian speech were largely exaggerated. He found little in phonology, morphology or syntax that could be attributed to Irish influence, and in Wells' report, only a small number of Irish words in use, one example being minseach  which he suggests is the noun goat.

Religion 
In 2001, the CIA estimated the primary religion as Protestant (67.1%, including Anglican 21.8%, Methodist 17%, Pentecostal 14.1%, Seventh-day Adventist 10.5%, and Church of God 3.7%), with Catholics constituting 11.6%, Rastafarian 1.4%, other 6.5%, none 2.6%, unspecified 10.8%.

Ethnic groups 
Residents of Montserrat are known as Montserratians. The population is predominantly, but not exclusively, of mixed African-Irish descent. It is not known with certainty how many African slaves and indentured Irish labourers were brought to the West Indies, though according to one estimate some 60,000 Irish were "Barbadosed" by Oliver Cromwell, some of whom would have arrived in Montserrat.

Data published by the Central Intelligence Agency indicates the ethnic group mix as follows (2011 est.):

88.4%: African/black 
3.7%: mixed 
3.0%: Hispanic/Spanish (of any race, including white)
2.7%: non-Hispanic Caucasian/white 
1.5%: East Indian/Indian
0.7%: other

Education 

Education in Montserrat is compulsory for children between the ages of 5 and 14, and free up to the age of 17. The only secondary school (pre-16 years of age) on the island is the Montserrat Secondary School (MSS) in Salem. Montserrat Community College (MCC) is a community college (post-16 and tertiary educational institution) in Salem. The University of the West Indies maintains its Montserrat Open Campus. University of Science, Arts and Technology is a private medical school in Olveston.

Culture

For more than a decade, George Martin's AIR Montserrat studio played host to recording sessions by many well known rock musicians, including Dire Straits, The Police, Rush, Elton John, Michael Jackson and The Rolling Stones. After the volcanic eruptions of 1995 through 1997, and until his death in 2016, George Martin raised funds to help the victims and families on the island. The first event was a star-studded event at London's Royal Albert Hall in September 1997 (Music for Montserrat) featuring many artists who had previously recorded on the island including Paul McCartney, Mark Knopfler, Elton John, Sting, Phil Collins, Eric Clapton and Midge Ure. The event raised £1.5 million. All the proceeds from the show went towards short-term relief for the islanders.

Martin's second major initiative was to release five hundred limited edition lithographs of his score for the Beatles song "Yesterday". Complete with mistakes and tea stains, the lithographs are numbered and signed by Paul McCartney and Martin. The lithograph sale raised more than US$1.4 million which helped fund the building of a new cultural and community centre for Montserrat and provided a much needed focal point to help the re-generation of the island.

Many albums of note were recorded at AIR Studios, including Rush's Power Windows, Dire Straits' Brothers in Arms; Duran Duran's Seven and the Ragged Tiger, The Police's Synchronicity and Ghost in the Machine (videos for "Every Little Thing She Does Is Magic" and "Spirits in the Material World" were filmed in Montserrat), and Jimmy Buffett's Volcano (named for Soufrière Hills). Ian Anderson (of Jethro Tull) recorded the song "Montserrat" on The Secret Language of Birds in tribute to the volcanic difficulties and feeling among residents of being abandoned by the UK government.

In 2017, Montserrat was used to film much of the 2020 film Wendy.

Media
Montserrat has one national radio station, Radio Montserrat. The station offers a wide selection of music and news within the island and also on the internet for Montserratians living overseas.

Notable shows include the Morning Show with Basil Chambers and Rose Willock's Cultural Show.

Cuisine

Montserrat's national dish is goat water, a thick goat meat stew served with crusty bread rolls. Montserrat cuisine resembles the general British and Caribbean cuisines, as it is situated in the Caribbean zone and it is a British territory. The cuisine includes a wide range of light meats, like fish, seafood and chicken, which are mostly grilled or roasted. Being a fusion of numerous cultures, such as Spanish, French, African, Indian and Amerindian, the Caribbean cuisine is unique and complex. More sophisticated meals include the Montserrat jerk shrimp, with rum, cinnamon bananas and cranberry. In other more rural areas, people prefer to eat homemade food, like the traditional mahi mahi and local breads.

Sport

Yachting
Montserrat is home to the Montserrat Yachting Association.

Athletics 
Montserrat has competed in every Commonwealth Games since 1994.

Miguel Francis who now represents the United Kingdom and previously represented Antigua and Barbuda was born in Montserrat. He holds the Antiguan National record over 200m in 19.88.

Basketball 
Basketball is growing in popularity in Montserrat with the country now setting up their own basketball league. The league contains six teams, which are the Look-Out Shooters, Davy Hill Ras Valley, Cudjoe Head Renegades, St. Peters Hilltop, Salem Jammers and MSS School Warriors. They have also built a new 800 seater complex which cost $1.5 million.

Cricket 
In common with many Caribbean islands, cricket is a very popular sport in Montserrat. Players from Montserrat are eligible to play for the West Indies cricket team. Jim Allen was the first to play for the West Indies and he represented the World Series Cricket West Indians, although, with a very small population, no other player from Montserrat had gone on to represent the West Indies until Lionel Baker made his One Day International debut against Pakistan in November 2008.

The Montserrat cricket team forms a part of the Leeward Islands cricket team in regional domestic cricket, however it plays as a separate entity in minor regional matches, as well having previously played Twenty20 cricket in the Stanford 20/20. Two grounds on the island have held first-class matches for the Leeward Islands, the first and most historic was Sturge Park in Plymouth, which had been in use since the 1920s. This was destroyed in 1997 by the volcanic eruption. A new ground, the Salem Oval, was constructed and opened in 2000. This has also held first-class cricket. A second ground has been constructed at Little Bay.

Football 

Montserrat has its own FIFA affiliated football team, and has competed in the World Cup qualifiers five times but failed to advance to the finals from 2002 to 2018. A field for the team was built near the airport by FIFA. In 2002, the team competed in a friendly match with the second-lowest-ranked team in FIFA at that time, Bhutan, in The Other Final, the same day as the final of the 2002 World Cup. Bhutan won 4–0. Montserrat has failed to qualify for any FIFA World Cup. They have also failed to ever qualify for the Gold Cup and Caribbean Cup. The current national team relies mostly on the diaspora resident in England and in the last World Cup qualification game against Curaçao nearly all the squad members played and lived in England.

Montserrat has a club league, the Montserrat Championship, which has played sporadically since 1974. The league was most recently on hiatus from 2005 until 2015 but restarted play in 2016.

Surfing 
Carrll Robilotta, whose parents moved from the United States to Montserrat in 1980, was responsible for pioneering the sport of surfing on the island. He and his brother Gary explored, discovered, and named the surf spots on the island during the 80's and early 90's.

Settlements 

Settlements within the exclusion zone are no longer habitable. See also List of settlements abandoned after the 1997 Soufrière Hills eruption.

Settlements in the safe zone 

 Baker Hill
 Banks
 Barzeys
 Blakes
 Brades
 Carr's Bay
 Cavalla Hill
 Cheap End
 Cudjoe Head
 Davy Hill
 Dick Hill
 Drummonds
 Flemmings
 Fogarty
 Frith
 Garibaldi Hill
 Gerald's
 Hope
 Jack Boy Hill
 Judy Piece
 Katy Hill
 Lawyers Mountain
 Little Bay
 Lookout
 Manjack
 Mongo Hill
 New Windward Estate
 Nixons
 Old Towne
 Olveston
 Peaceful Cottage
 Salem
 Shinlands
 St. John's
 St. Peter's
 Sweeney's
 Woodlands
 Yellow Hill

Abandoned settlements in the exclusion zone 
Settlements in italics have been destroyed by pyroclastic flows since the 1997 eruption. Others have been evacuated or destroyed since 1995.
 
 Amersham
 Beech Hill
 Bethel
 Bramble
 Bransby
 Bugby Hole
 Cork Hill
 Dagenham
 Delvins
 Dyers
 Elberton
 Farm
 Fairfield
 Fairy Walk
 Farrells
 Farells Yard
 Ffryes
 Fox's Bay
 Gages
 Gallways Estate
 Gringoes
 Gun Hill
 Happy Hill
 Harris
 Harris Lookout
 Hermitage
 Hodge's Hill
 Jubilee
 Kinsale
 Lees
 Locust Valley
 Long Ground
 Molyneux
 Morris
 Parsons
 Plymouth
 Richmond
 Richmond Hill
 Roche's Yard
 Robuscus Mt
 Shooter's Hill
 Soufrière
 Spanish Point
 St. George's Hill
 St. Patrick's
 Streatham
 Trants
 Trials
 Tuitts
 Victoria
 Webbs
 Weekes
 White's
 Windy Hill

Notable Montserratians 
 
 
 Jim Allen, former cricketer who represented the World Series Cricket West Indians
 Jennette Arnold, the first Montserratian elected as a Member of the London Assembly.
 Lionel Baker, the first Montserratian to represent the West Indies in international cricket
 Alphonsus "Arrow" Cassell, musician known for his soca song "Hot Hot Hot"
 Margaret Dyer-Howe, Montserrat's second woman to be appointed a cabinet minister.
 Ettore Ewen, American professional wrestler and former WWE Heavyweight Champion, 11-time tag team champion, former college football player and powerlifter.
 Howard A. Fergus, author, poet and three time acting governor of Montserrat
 Patricia Griffin, pioneer nurse and volunteer social worker
 George Irish, writer, human rights activist
 E. A. Markham, poet and author
 Dean Mason, association footballer
 Shane Ryan, writer, human rights activist
 Veronica Ryan, sculptor, and winner of the 2022 Turner Prize
 M. P. Shiel, writer
 Lyle Taylor, association footballer
 Rowan Taylor, international footballer
 Maizie Williams, member of pop group Boney M
 Angela Yee, member of the syndicated morning radio show The Breakfast Club

See also 
 Bibliography of Montserrat
 Index of Montserrat-related articles
 Outline of Montserrat

Notes

References

Further reading
Akenson, Donald Harman – If the Irish Ran the World: Montserrat, 1630-1730. 
Brussell, David Eric – Potions, Poisons, and Panaceas: An Ethnobotanical Study of Montserrat. 
Dobbin, Jay D. – The Jombee Dance of Montserrat: A Study of Trance Ritual in the West Indies. 
Perrett, Frank A. – The Volcano-Seismic Crisis at Montserrat, 1933-37. 
Philpott, Stuart B. – West Indian Migration: The Montserrat Case. 
Possekel, Anja K. – Living with the Unexpected: Linking Disaster Recovery to Sustainable Development in Montserrat.

External links

Government
 Government of Montserrat
 Montserrat National Trust
 Premier of Montserrat

General information
 Montserrat. The World Factbook. Central Intelligence Agency.
 Montserrat from UCB Libraries GovPubs.
 
 Montserrat Webdirectory
 Story of the black Irish in Montserrat

News media
 Montserrat Reporter news site
 Radio Montserrat—ZJB Listen live online

Travel
 Montserrat Tourist Board
 Montserrat Magazine Publications 
 Montserrat Magazine

Health reports
 Toxicity of volcanic ash from Montserrat  by RT Cullen, AD Jones, BG Miller, CL Tran, JMG Davis, K Donaldson, M Wilson, V Stone, and A Morgan. Institute of Occupational Medicine Research Report TM/02/01.
 A Health Survey of Workers on the Island of Montserrat  by HA Cowie, MK Graham, A Searl, BG Miller, PA Hutchison, C Swales, S Dempsey, and M Russell. Institute of Occupational Medicine Research Report TM/02/02.
 A Health Survey of Montserratians Relocated to the UK  by HA Cowie, A Searl, PJ Ritchie, MK Graham, PA Hutchison, and A Pilkington. Institute of Occupational Medicine Research Report TM/01/07.

Others
 Montserrat Volcano Observatory
 Official release archive
 Antigua, Montserrat and Virgin Islands Gazette  at the Digital Library of the Caribbean

 
Island countries
.Montserrat
Dependent territories in the Caribbean
English-speaking countries and territories
Islands of British Overseas Territories
Member states of the Caribbean Community
Member states of the Organisation of Eastern Caribbean States
Small Island Developing States
Former English colonies
1640s establishments in the Caribbean
1642 establishments in North America
1642 establishments in the British Empire
States and territories established in 1962
1960s establishments in the Caribbean
1962 establishments in North America